Administrator of the Turks and Caicos was the administrator of the Turks and Caicos from 1859 to 1973. It replaced the previous post of Commissioner of the Turks and Caicos and was replaced by the Governor of the Turks and Caicos after 1973.

A list of Commissioners:
 Geoffrey Colin Guy (1921–2006) 1959–1965
 Robert Everard Wainwright (1913–1990) 1965, 1967–1971
 John Anthony Golding (1920–2012) 1965–1967
 Alexander Graham Mitchell (1923–) 1971–1973

References
 Turks and Caicos Islands

 
Governors of the Turks and Caicos Islands